Risø DTU National Laboratory for Sustainable Energy  is a scientific research organization north of Roskilde, Denmark.

The Risø DTU organisation was founded in 1956 and dissolved on 1 January 2012. The location is now known as DTU Risø Campus and the buildings are home to a number of institutes under the Technical University of Denmark (DTU) and separately is also home to Aarhus University Dept of Environmental Science and part of Dept of Bioscience. Risø covers an area of more than 2.6 square kilometres.

Organisation 
From 1 January 2008, it was made an institute of the Technical University of Denmark (DTU). On 1 January 2007, the Technical University of Denmark merged with the Danish Institute for Food and Veterinary Research, the Danish Institute for Fisheries Research, Danish National Space Center, the Danish Transport Research Institute and Risø National Laboratory. Before this, Risø National Laboratory was a research institute under the Danish Ministry of Science, Technology and Innovation and consisted of eight research departments: Biosystems, Polymer Department, Fuel Cells and Solid State Chemistry, Materials Research, Optics and Plasma Research, Radiation Research, Systems Analysis and Wind Energy.

History 
Risø was founded in 1956, but not officially inaugurated until 1958. Niels Bohr played a key role in the founding of Risø and was chairman of the Nuclear Energy Commission charged to promote the peaceful use of nuclear power.

The mission of Risø was "to create new knowledge based on world-class research, and to ensure that our knowledge is used to promote the development of an innovative and sustainable society" (from the web page).

In the first three decades, the centre's activities were centred around research on peaceful use of nuclear energy. From these times, Risø is the site of three research nuclear reactors: DR-1, DR-2 and DR-3. DR-3 is a DIDO class nuclear reactor. All reactors are no more in use, they have been shut down and are undergoing decommissioning.

Risø was in its later years particularly noted for its involvement in wind energy and solid-oxide fuel cells.

Risø had strong competences in climate change effects studies and had "state of the art" facilities for realistic climate change experiments and monitoring. These included
 RERAF (Risø Environmental Risk Assessment facility) - a phytotrone controlled environment growth facility.
 Sorø beech forest. A field station in an 80-year-old beech forest measuring carbon inputs, outputs and turnover processes by advanced techniques (e.g. eddy covariance).
CLIMAITE - Climate change effects on biological processes in terrestrial ecosystems. A field scale climate change experiment conducting multifactor experiments with elevated CO2, night time warming and altered precipitation.

The organization employed about 700 staff (660 person-years) in 2005.

On 1 January 2012 Risø DTU was dissolved. The location is now called DTU Risø Campus and is home to a number of DTU institutes.

Collaborators and users 
National Environmental Research Institute of Denmark) The Risø area also house National Environmental Research Institute (NERI) part of the Danish University of Aarhus. NERI is "an independent research faculty under University of Aarhus. NERI undertakes scientific consultancy work, monitoring of nature and the environment as well as applied and strategic research. NERI’s task is to establish a scientific foundation for environmental policy decisions"
DTU Fotonik also use some of the facilities, as a part of the Optics and Plasma Research department was transferred this institute as part of the merger.

WAsP
Wind Atlas Analysis and Application Program (WAsP) is a tool used in the wind energy industry to simulate wind flow over terrain and estimate the long-term power production of wind turbines and wind farms. It has been in development by Risø and DTU Wind Energy for over 30 years, and runs on PCs using Microsoft Windows.  The name WAsP is short for WAAAP ("W, some A's, and a P"), the acronym of the software name. Current version is 12.6

See also
List of nuclear reactors
1968 Thule Air Base B-52 crash

References

External links
 The official site of Risø
 The official site of Aarhus University Dept of Environmental Science
 The official site of Aarhus University Dept of Bioscience
 Page for foreign employees starting work at Risø

Government agencies of Denmark
Energy in Denmark
Former nuclear research institutes
Multidisciplinary research institutes
Research institutes in Denmark
Roskilde